Bulbostylis capillaris is a species of sedge known by the common names densetuft hairsedge and threadleaf beakseed. It is native to much of North America, South America and the West Indies from Canada to Bolivia.

Bulbostylis capillaris grows in many types of habitat, generally in moist areas such as streamside meadows. It is an annual herb which is somewhat variable in appearance but generally takes the form of a small, upright tuft of green herbage growing close to the ground, between 10 and 24 centimeters tall.  There are several stems surrounded by thready, thin leaves. The inflorescence occurs at the tip of the stem and is composed of tiny spikelets which are green washed with rusty red. The fruit is about a millimeter long.

Uses 
Along with Piptochaetium montevidense and Juncus capillacaeus, Bulbostylis capillaris is used in Rio Grande do Sul as a medicinal plant in the form of a tisane to treat urinary tract infections (UTIs). This claim of antimicrobial activity against two common causes of UTIs, E. coli and Klebsiella pneumoniae, was investigated by Vogel et al. (2011) but found no evidence of effectiveness in treating bacterial infections.

References

External links
Jepson Manual Treatment
USDA Plants Profile
Missouri Plants
Photo gallery

capillaris
Flora of North America
Flora of South America
Plants described in 1753
Taxa named by Carl Linnaeus